Superbi is the tenth and final album by the British group The Beautiful South, released on 15 May 2006 by SonyBMG. The album entered the British chart at No. 6 before dropping to No. 20 and No. 37 in its second and third weeks respectively. It was released before their split on 30 January 2007. The album was produced by the former Tears for Fears keyboard player Ian Stanley.

Track listing
All tracks composed by Paul Heaton and Dave Rotheray
"The Rose of My Cologne" - 3:47
"Manchester" - 3:54
"There Is Song" - 4:08
"The Cat Loves the Mouse" - 3:36
"The Next Verse" - 4:53
"When Romance Is Dead" - 3:01
"Meanwhile" - 3:18
"Space" - 3:37
"Bed of Nails" - 4:10
"Never Lost a Chicken to a Fox" - 4:14
"From Now On" - 4:43
"Tears" - 4:05

Singles
"Manchester" was released on 8 May 2006 in the UK.  It reached 41 in the singles chart, a very disappointing position compared to other first singles. This is thought to be due to the decline of CD singles which, by 2006, were increasingly the preserve of an older audience.

"The Rose of My Cologne" was released on 10 July 2006 in the UK.  It reached 99 in the singles chart for the first week. This made this single the worst performing out of all of those released by the band.

As was their usual modus operandi, The Beautiful South included unreleased material on the B-sides of the singles taken from their albums.

from the "Manchester" CD single
"Manchester"
"If Teardrops Were Silver"

from "The Rose of My Cologne" CD single
"The Rose of My Cologne"
”Farewell” (although its title is a coincidence, this turned out to be the last new track released by the band)

Personnel
The Beautiful South
Paul Heaton – vocals
Dave Hemingway – vocals
Alison Wheeler – vocals
Dave Rotheray – guitar
Sean Welch – bass
Dave Stead – drums
with: 
Damon Butcher - keyboards
Gary Hammond - percussion
Johnny Scott - banjo, dobro, mandolin
The London Session Orchestra - strings; arranged by Simon Hale
Technical
Bruno Ellington, Kieran Lynch - engineer
Bill Price, Richard Rainey - mixing
Martin Parr - cover photography

References

2006 albums
The Beautiful South albums
Albums produced by Ian Stanley
Sony BMG albums